The Iowa Natural Heritage Foundation (INHF) is a statewide non-profit natural conservation organization based in Des Moines, Iowa. INHF is donor-supported and has a membership of roughly 7,000. The current president of INHF is Joe McGovern, with former President Mark Ackelson serving as the President Emeritus.

Projects
INHF  works with partner organizations to preserve and protect natural landscapes throughout the state. Landowners interested in protecting their land either donate or sell property to INHF, who will work to conserve and/or restore its natural features.

In most cases, INHF takes ownership of land temporarily, while public conservation agencies (local, county, state or federal) raise funds to purchase the property. During this time, INHF will lend technical and professional assistance to these agencies, as well as work to restore native ecosystems.
INHF works directly with landowners to make sure that the transaction meets their wishes. INHF staff will meet with landowners to negotiate the sale or donation of their land, as well as the transfer to whatever agency will retain permanent ownership.
In most cases, project sites that INHF assists with will become public land, open for exploration, hunting, fishing, camping and other activities, depending on the site.
INHF also works with landowners to protect their land through conservation easements, in which a landowner relinquishes certain rights to all or part of his or her property (e.g. farming or mining), while still retaining ownership. INHF and the private owners develop a legally binding agreement regarding which property uses will be allowed or restricted. This agreement applies to the current owner and all future owners. INHF has completed 139 conservation easements throughout Iowa.

In very few cases, INHF will retain permanent ownership of a project site. These sites, like Snyder Farm in Polk County, are used to further INHF's goals. Snyder is used as a training ground and example of how a farm can be converted into tall grass prairie and oak savanna.

Notable land projects
INHF has done more than 700 land projects. Below are a few of the most well-known or most significant of these projects.
 Mines of Spain
 Heritage addition to Effigy Mounds National Monument
 Hitchcock Nature Area (Loess Hills)
 Chichaqua Bottoms Greenbelt
 Iowa River Greenbelt
 Upper Iowa River
 Trout stream rehabilitation and restoration
 Angler's Bay on Big Spirit Lake
 Additions to numerous state and county parks

References

Environment of Iowa
Nature conservation organizations based in the United States
Organizations established in 1979
Non-profit organizations based in Iowa
1979 establishments in Iowa